The purplish-mantled tanager (Iridosornis porphyrocephalus) is a species of bird in the family Thraupidae.
It is found in Colombia and Ecuador.
Its natural habitats are subtropical or tropical moist montane forests and heavily degraded former forest.
It is threatened by habitat loss.

References

purplish-mantled tanager
Birds of the Colombian Andes
Birds of the Ecuadorian Andes
purplish-mantled tanager
purplish-mantled tanager
Taxonomy articles created by Polbot